Jim Johnston is a musician from Bristol, England. Formerly one half of trip-hop band Monk & Canatella with Simon Russell in the 1990s. He now performs as a solo artist.

He released his debut solo album, Voyage of Oblivion in 2012. The album featured guest vocals from Australian folk singer Emily Barker.

In December 2014, he performed in Bristol with producer Marc Collin in his new project, providing guest vocals on the Monk and Canatella track, "I Can Water My Plants"

In 2015, he released his second solo album, After All the Wishing…. This time featuring guest vocals from Bristol post-punk musician Mark Stewart from The Pop Group. The track "Count Your Coppers" featured on BBC Introducing, and also on the Tom Robinson mix tape on BBC 6 Music in February 2015.

Discography
 Voyage of Oblivion (2012) Rattlewatch Records
 After All the Wishing… (2015) Rattlewatch Records
 Three-Dimensional Living (2018) Rattlewatch Records

References
9. https://www.divideandconquermusic.com/indie-music-album-reviews/jim-johnston-three-dimensional-living

Living people
Musicians from Bristol
Year of birth missing (living people)